Ólafur Örn Bjarnason (born 15 May 1975) is an Icelandic former professional footballer who played as a centre-back.

Club career
He started his career in Grindavík, and returned there after two years in Swedish club Malmö FF. In 2004, he moved from Grindavík to SK Brann in Bergen, Norway. His first season was successful, and he played every league match. In 2006, he formed one of Norway's strongest centre back duo with his countryman, Kristján Örn Sigurðsson, together named Örneredet (en: eagles nest).

He returned to Grindavík in August 2010 in a player/manager role. With 213 official matches for Brann, he's the most capped foreign player, and 11th most capped player in the club's history. Before the 2013 season he signed for Fram.

International career
Ólafur has been capped 27 times for Iceland. He made his début in a friendly match in June 1998 against South Africa as a substitute for Sverrir Sverrisson.

Coaching career
On 24 June 2010 returned to Grindavík and was named as their new head coach, he replaced Milan Stefán Jankovic. After the 2011 season he quit as manager, but decided nonetheless to play for them in the 2012 season.

Honours

Norway
Norwegian Premier League: 2007
Norwegian cup: 2004

References

1975 births
Living people
Olafur Orn
Olafur Orn
Olafur Orn
Olafur Orn
Olafur Orn
Olafur Orn
Malmö FF players
SK Brann players
Expatriate footballers in Norway
Expatriate footballers in Sweden
Eliteserien players
Allsvenskan players
Olafur Orn
Olafur Orn
Association football defenders